Jos International Stadium is a multi-use stadium in Jos, Plateau, Nigeria. It is used mostly for football matches. The stadium has a capacity of 60,000 spectators.

It will be the home stadium of Plateau United.

References

Football venues in Nigeria
2018 establishments in Nigeria
Sports venues completed in 2018